The Japan Bloodhorse Breeding Association (or ) is a public company established to manage the racehorse breeding industry in Japan.

It was founded in 1946 as the Thoroughbred Corporation Association, and was renamed to the Thoroughbred Breeding Agricultural Union in 1948 before being renamed to the current name in 1955. The JBBA offers many programs to help small-time thoroughbred breeders around the country. The stallions that they offer are often subsidized so that every breeder has an opportunity to breed to top stallions.

Other than stallions, the JBBA also offers:
 Financial aid for importing mares
 Financial aid to update breeding and training facilities
 Farm management support and training
 Operate the Japan Bloodstock Information System
 Organizing and marketing public sales of thoroughbred horses
 Educating people who want to work in the breeding industry
 Promoting racing through awards and sponsoring races
 Publishing industry news and statistics
 Providing information to racing fans about racehorse breeding
 Lobbying the government and racing authorities for the interests of the breeders
 Participating in international breeding and racing conferences

Stallion Stations

Shizunai Stallion Station 
The Shizunai Stallion Station was opened in 1963 in Shizunai, Hokkaido. The farm covers 652,600 square metres and holds 15 stallions. The following horses are held here as of 2023:
Caravaggio USA
Chief Bearhart CAN
Creator USA
David Junior USA
Declaration of War USA
Bago FR
Makfi GB
Mischievous Alex USA
Noble Mission GB
Other notable horses who have stood at Shizunai Stallion Station includes Pilsudski, Coronado's Quest, Dancing Brave, Silver Charm, Tabasco Cat, Opera House, Came Home, Stravinsky, Boston Harbor, and the recently pensioned Forty Niner.

Shichinohe Stallion Station 
Shichinohe Stallion Station was opened in 1962 and covers 16,700 square meters in Shichinohe, Aomori. It holds four stallions. The following horses are stabled there as of 2023:  
Aldebaran II USA
Eskendereya USA

Kyūshū Stallion Station 
The Kyushu Stallion Station was opened in 1964 and covers 42,300 square meters in Kagoshima, Kyūshū. It has stables for four stallions. The following horses are stabled there:
Cape Blanco IRE
Nero JP
Squirtle Squirt USA
In addition to the above, JBBA owned stallion stations in the following locations before closing in the years between 2007 and 2012: Nasu, Shimofusa, and Iburi.

Facilities 
The JBBA also operates an export quarantine facility in Shizunai and Iburi alongside its stallion stations. In addition, they operate the Racehorse's Hometown Information Center (Japanese:競走馬のふるさと案内所), which serves as a tourist information center for anyone that wants to visit retired horses.

See also
 National Association of Racing (NAR) - Japan's local government racing association
 Japan Racing Association (JRA) - Japan's national racing association

References

External links 
 Japan Bloodhorse Breeders' Association
 Japan Bloodstock Information System
 Racehorse's Hometown Information Center (Japanese Only)

Horse racing organizations in Japan